The 2018 24H Touring Car Endurance Series powered by Hankook was the third season of the Touring Car Endurance Series (TCES). Creventic was the organiser and promoter of the series. The races were contested with touring cars.

Calendar

Entry List

Race results
Bold indicates overall winner.

See also
Touring Car Endurance Series
2018 24H GT Series
2018 24H Proto Series
2018 Dubai 24 Hour

Notes

References

External links

2018
2018 in motorsport
2018 in 24H Series